Vasco da Gama (c. 1460s–1524) was a famous Portuguese explorer.

Vasco da Gama may also refer to:

Arts
Vascodigama, a Kannada film
L'Africaine, an opera by Meyerbeer with the working title Vasco de Gama [sic], published in a critical edition by Ricordi in 2018 under that latter name

People
Vasco da Gama (council speaker), South African politician

Places
Vasco da Gama, Goa, India
Vasco da Gama (crater), lunar crater

Ships
Vasco da Gama class frigate, class of frigates of the Portuguese Navy, including,
NRP Vasco da Gama (F330)
Vasco da Gama (cruiser) 1876-1936, ironclad and later cruiser of the Portuguese Navy
CMA CGM Vasco de Gama, a container ship
Vasco da Gama (cruise ship)

Structures
Vasco da Gama Bridge, near Lisbon, Portugal
Vasco da Gama Tower, Lisbon, Portugal

Football  clubs
Club de Regatas Vasco da Gama, Rio de Janeiro, Brazil
Vasco Esporte Clube, Sergipe, Brazil
Associação Desportiva Vasco da Gama, Rio Branco, Brazil
Bridgeport Vasco da Gama,  Bridgeport, Connecticut; United States
NITEL Vasco Da Gama F.C., Enugu, Nigeria
Vasco SC, Goa, India
Vasco da Gama (South Africa), Cape Town